Beit Aryeh-Ofarim is an Israeli settlement and local council in the northern West Bank. It is situated on the Palestinian side of the Israeli West Bank barrier, on 8,500 dunams of land.
 
Israeli settlements in the West Bank are considered illegal under international law, but the Israeli government disputes this.

History
Established in 1981, Beit Aryeh was recognised as a local council in 1989. In 2004, it merged with Ofarim. Beit Aryeh was named for former Knesset member Aryeh Ben-Eliezer, a prominent Revisionist Zionist leader who was amongst the founders of Herut.

According to ARIJ, the land for Beit Aryeh-Ofarim was confiscated by Israel from two nearby Palestinian villages: Aboud and Al-Lubban al-Gharbi.

In 2011, the Israeli Ministry of Defense signed an agreement with the municipality of Beit Aryeh approving the construction of 100 homes and a bypass road between Beit Aryeh and Ofarim.

In 2020, Beit Aryeh-Ofarim was one of several Israeli settlements that dumped its untreated sewage onto lands of the nearby Palestinian village of Deir Ballut.

Notable residents
Doron Matalon
Aleks Tarn
Neil Druckmann

References

External links
Local council website  

Local councils in Israel
Israeli settlements in the West Bank
1981 establishments in the Israeli Military Governorate
Populated places established in 1981